Ricardo Rivaldo Jade McPhee (born 3 June 1999) is a Bahamian footballer who plays for United FC and the Bahamas national football team.

International career
McPhee made his senior international debut on 7 September 2018 in a 4-0 away defeat to Belize during CONCACAF Nations League qualifying.

International goals
Scores and results list the Bahamas' goal tally first.

References

External links

1999 births
Living people
Bahamian footballers
Bahamas international footballers
Association football forwards
Sportspeople from Nassau, Bahamas